Tradewind Pictures is a German production company, founded in 1998. It produces both feature filmsprimarily children's films and family filmsand documentaries. Among its productions are Erik of het klein insectenboek (2004), Niceland (Population. 1.000.002) (2004), and Fíaskó (2000). The company was founded by Thomas Springer and Helmut G. Weber, and has offices in Cologne and Erfurt.

References

Film production companies of Germany